, known before launch as MS-T5, was Japan's first interplanetary spacecraft, and the first deep space probe to be launched by any country other than the USA or the Soviet Union. It aimed to demonstrate the performance of the new launch vehicle, test its ability to escape from Earth gravity, and observe the interplanetary medium and magnetic field. Sakigake was also supposed to act as a frame of reference for data received from probes that flew closer to Halley's Comet.  Early measurements would be used to improve the mission of the Suisei probe launched several months later.

Sakigake was developed by the Institute of Space and Astronautical Science for the National Space Development Agency (both of which are now part of the Japanese Aerospace Exploration Agency, or JAXA).  It became a part of the Halley Armada together with Suisei, the Soviet Vega probes, the ESA Giotto and the NASA International Cometary Explorer, to explore Halley's Comet during its 1986 sojourn through the inner Solar System.

Design
Unlike its twin Suisei, it carried no imaging instruments in its instrument payload.

Launch
Sakigake was launched January 7, 1985, from Kagoshima Space Center by M-3SII launch vehicle on M-3SII-1 mission.

Halley encounter
It carried out a flyby of Halley's Comet on March 11, 1986 at a distance of 6.99 million km.

Giacobini-Zinner encounter
There were plans for the spacecraft to go on to an encounter with 21P/Giacobini-Zinner in 1998 but the flyby had to be abandoned due to lack of propellant.

End of mission
Telemetry contact was lost on November 15, 1995, though a beacon signal continued to be received until January 7, 1999.

References

External links

 Sakigake
 Sakigake Mission Profile by NASA's Solar System Exploration
 Halley's Comet Flyby
 Sakigake Mission Comet Halley Data Archive at the NASA Planetary Data System, Small Bodies Node

Japanese space probes
Missions to Halley's Comet
Satellites orbiting the Sun
1985 in spaceflight
Derelict space probes
Spacecraft launched in 1985
Japanese inventions